Dracula mopsus is a species of orchid.

mopsus